Josh Walters (born 23 December 1994) is an English professional rugby league footballer who plays as a  forward for London Broncos in the Betfred Championship. 

He played for the Leeds Rhinos in the Super League, and spent time on loan from Leeds at the Hunslet Hawks and Featherstone Rovers in the Championship. Walters also spent a season with Featherstone in the second tier.

Background
Walters was born in Guildford, Surrey, England.

Playing career

Leeds Rhinos
A former rugby union player, Walters converted to league and joined Leeds Rhinos in 2013, making his Super League début in 2014 against Huddersfield Giants. He went on to make 8 appearances that year, scoring three tries. He made a further 9 appearances in 2015 and was also dual registered with Hunslet Hawks.

Walters played from the bench in the 2015 Super League Grand Final, and scored the match-winning try in what was his first play-off appearance.

Featherstone Rovers
Walters joined Featherstone ahead of the 2019 Championship season.

London Broncos
He moved to the capital following the Broncos relegation at the conclusion of the 2019 Super League season.

Honours
Super League: 2015

League Leaders' Shield: 2015

Challenge Cup: 2015

Club statistics

References

External links

London Broncos profile
Leeds Rhinos profile
(archived by web.archive.org) Leeds Rhinos Academy profile
SL profile

1994 births
Living people
Black British sportspeople
English rugby league players
Featherstone Rovers players
Hunslet R.L.F.C. players
Leeds Rhinos players
London Broncos players
Rugby league second-rows
Rugby league locks
Rugby league players from Surrey